Philipp Schwethelm is a retired German professional basketball player. He competed with the German national basketball team at the 2010 FIBA World Championship.

Professional career
Schwethelm began his professional career in 2005 with German side Köln 99ers (then called RheinEnergie Köln).  He played sparingly for two seasons before seeing significant action starting with the 2007–08 season.  While with the 99ers, he participated in EuroCup 2005–06, 2006–07 Euroleague, and ULEB Cup 2007–08.

In 2009, the 99ers declared bankruptcy.  Schwethelm was then linked to a two-year deal with fellow Bundesliga side Eisbären Bremerhaven.  In the 2009–10 season, he averaged a career-high seven points per game in helping the team to the league semifinals.

In June 2015, he parted ways with ratiopharm Ulm. Later that month, he signed with EWE Baskets Oldenburg.

On May 27, 2021, he has announced his retirement from professional basketball.

International career
Schwethelm was one of the top junior players in Germany.  He first played with the German national basketball team at the 2004 FIBA Europe Under-16 Championship. He later competed with the junior squads at both the 2008 and 2009 FIBA Europe Under-20 Championship.

Schwethelm's first major tournament as a member of the German senior national team was the 2010 FIBA World Championship in Turkey.

References

External links
ratiopharm Ulm profile

1989 births
Living people
2010 FIBA World Championship players
Eisbären Bremerhaven players
EWE Baskets Oldenburg players
FC Bayern Munich basketball players
German men's basketball players
Köln 99ers players
Ratiopharm Ulm players
Small forwards